Six ships and a shore establishment of the Royal Navy have been named HMS Europa, after the Greek mythological character Europa.

 was a hulk, a former Dutch ship captured in 1673. She was burnt by accident in 1675.
 was a 64-gun third rate launched in 1765. She was renamed HMS Europe in 1778 and was broken up in 1814.
 was a gunboat commissioned in 1782. She was one of 12 that the garrison at Gibraltar launched during the Great Siege of Gibraltar. Each was armed with an 18-pounder gun, and received a crew of 21 men drawn from Royal Navy vessels stationed at Gibraltar.  provided Europas crew.
 was a 50-gun fourth rate launched in 1783. She became a troopship in 1798 and was sold in 1814. 
 was a transport hired in 1854.
 was a  launched in 1897 and sold in 1920.
 was the name of the Central Depot for the Royal Naval Patrol Service in Lowestoft from early in the Second World War until she was decommissioned in 1946.  It was originally the garden of a private house and was called Sparrows Nest. When first opened in September 1939 it was called Pembroke X.

Citations and references

Citations

References

Drinkwater, John (1905) A History of the Siege of Gibraltar, 1779–1783: With a Description and Account of that Garrison from the Earliest Times. (J. Murray).

Royal Navy ship names